Ramón Piñeiro (born 29 October 1991 in Barcelona) is a Spanish racing driver.

Career

Formula BMW
Piñeiro began his formula racing career in 2008 in Formula BMW Europe with Fortec Motorsport. He finished twentieth in standings, taking five points-scoring positions in sixteen races. For 2009, Piñeiro remained in the series, but switched to FMS International. He again changed team to Motaworld Racing after Coloni took full control of the FMS International from Valencia onwards.

Formula Palmer Audi
After his FBMW campaign concluded in September, Piñeiro competed in the final two rounds of the Formula Palmer Audi championship at Silverstone and Snetterton. Piñeiro survived a big accident during the third of the Silverstone races. Running behind Kazim Vasiliauskas, Piñeiro picked up the slipstream from behind the Lithuanian driver's car. He clipped the rear wheel of the car after Vasiliauskas moved his car to defend into Stowe. Piñeiro was launched skywards, before landing and executing a barrel-roll before landing wheels up. He was unhurt. He finished third in the final race at Snetterton, three seconds behind winner Felix Rosenqvist, after an early crash took many of his rivals.

Personal life
Piñeiro list his hobbies as all sports, fitness, music, while his favourite circuits are Valencia Street Circuit, Circuit de Monaco and Circuit de Spa-Francorchamps. His favourite driver is Michael Schumacher. He is currently studying automotive engineering with motorsport at the University of Hertfordshire, where he will continue his studies for another 10 years.

Racing record

Career summary

Complete FIA Formula Two Championship results
(key) (Races in bold indicate pole position) (Races in italics indicate fastest lap)

References

External links
 
Piñeiro career statistics at Driver Database

1991 births
Living people
Spanish racing drivers
Formula BMW Europe drivers
Formula Palmer Audi drivers
FIA Formula Two Championship drivers
Racing drivers from Barcelona
FIA Institute Young Driver Excellence Academy drivers
Motaworld Racing drivers
Fortec Motorsport drivers
Team West-Tec drivers
Scuderia Coloni drivers